Normaltica is a genus of flea beetles found in the Greater Antilles. They are distinctive for their clavate antennae (having one end thicker than the other, like a club), not found in other known New World flea beetles.

Species
N. iviei
N. obrieni

References

Alticini
Chrysomelidae genera